The 2011 Ceuta Assembly election was held on Sunday, 22 May 2011, to elect the 5th Assembly of the Autonomous City of Ceuta. All 25 seats in the Assembly were up for election. The election was held simultaneously with regional elections in thirteen autonomous communities and local elections all throughout Spain.

The People's Party (PP) has dominated recent elections to the Assembly, winning 19 of the seats in the 2003 and 2007 elections and polls suggested incorrectly that the PP was likely to increase its majority. The second largest party, the Ceutan Democratic Union (UCDE), formed an electoral alliance with the Socialist Party of the People of Ceuta (PSPC) under the name Caballas Coalition (Caballas). UCDE did not repeat its alliance with United Left of Ceuta (IU), that decided not to take part in the election. The third largest party, the Spanish Socialist Workers' Party (PSOE), was predicted incorrectly to overtake the Caballas Coalition, according to opinion polls.

Juan Jesús Vivas Lara (PP) retained the post of Mayor-President, held since 2001.

Electoral system
The Assembly of Ceuta was the top-tier administrative and governing body of the autonomous city of Ceuta. Voting for the Assembly was on the basis of universal suffrage, which comprised all nationals over eighteen, registered and residing in the municipality of Ceuta and in full enjoyment of their political rights, as well as resident non-national European citizens and those whose country of origin allowed Spanish nationals to vote in their own elections by virtue of a treaty.

The 25 members of the Assembly of Ceuta were elected using the D'Hondt method and a closed list proportional representation, with a threshold of 5 percent of valid votes—which included blank ballots—being applied. Parties not reaching the threshold were not taken into consideration for seat distribution.

The Mayor-President was indirectly elected by the plenary assembly. A legal clause required that mayoral candidates earned the vote of an absolute majority of members, or else the candidate of the most-voted party in the assembly was to be automatically appointed to the post. In case of a tie, a toss-up would determine the appointee.

The electoral law provided that parties, federations, coalitions and groupings of electors were allowed to present lists of candidates. However, groupings of electors were required to secure the signature of a determined amount of the electors registered in Ceuta. Concurrently, parties and federations intending to enter in coalition to take part jointly at an election were required to inform the relevant Electoral Commission within ten days of the election being called.

Parties and leaders
Below is a list of the main parties and coalitions which contested the election:

Opinion polls
The table below lists voting intention estimates in reverse chronological order, showing the most recent first and using the dates when the survey fieldwork was done, as opposed to the date of publication. Where the fieldwork dates are unknown, the date of publication is given instead. The highest percentage figure in each polling survey is displayed with its background shaded in the leading party's colour. If a tie ensues, this is applied to the figures with the highest percentages. The "Lead" column on the right shows the percentage-point difference between the parties with the highest percentages in a poll. When available, seat projections determined by the polling organisations are displayed below (or in place of) the percentages in a smaller font; 13 seats were required for an absolute majority in the Assembly of Ceuta.

Results

Notes

References
Opinion poll sources

Other

Ceuta
Elections in Ceuta